The 2006–07 Maltese Third Division (referred to as the BOV Third Division for sponsorship reasons) was the league season of the Maltese Third Division which spanned from 24 September 2006 until 7 May 2007.

Teams 

A total of 19 teams participated in the 2006–07 Third Division. Mdina Knights made their league debut after they were founded in 2006, while Qrendi rejoined the Maltese football league system after a nine-year absence following their last appearance in the 1996–97 Second Division season. At the end of the season, a series of promotion-relegation play-off matches are contested by the teams finishing between third and fifth place in the Third Division and the tenth-placed team in the Second Division; the winner, acquires promotion to the Second Division.

League table

Results

Play-offs

Season statistics

Top scorers

Hat-tricks

See also 
 2006–07 Second & Third Division knock-out

References

External links 
 Official website

Maltese Third Division seasons
4
Malta